Gregory or Greg Johnson may refer to:

Entertainment
 Greg Johnson (comedian), American stand-up comedian, actor, and television host
 Gregory B. Johnson (born 1951), pianist and member of the band Cameo
 Greg Johnson (game designer) (born 1960), of video games Starflight and ToeJam & Earl
 Greg Johnson (musician) (born 1968), New Zealand-born singer and songwriter

Sports
 Greg Johnson (American football coach), Prairie View A&M
 Greg Johnson (defensive lineman) (born 1953)
 Greg Johnson (curler) (born 1975), American curler
 Greg Johnson (ice hockey) (1971–2019), National Hockey League forward
 Gregg Johnson (born 1982), former professional ice hockey player in the East Coast Hockey League
 Greg Johnson (rugby league) (born 1990), professional rugby player

Other
 Greg Johnson (businessman) (born 1960s), CEO of Franklin Templeton Investments
 Greg Johnson (pastor), (American Presbyterian minister
 Greg Johnson (white nationalist) (born 1971), American white nationalist
 Gregory G. Johnson (born 1946), US Navy admiral
 Gregory C. Johnson (born 1954), astronaut
 Gregory H. Johnson (born 1962), astronaut
 Gregory Lee Johnson (born 1956), defendant in the landmark Supreme Court case Texas v. Johnson

See also
 Greg Johnston (disambiguation)